Madeleine Arthur (born March 10, 1997) is a Canadian and American actress.

Career 
Arthur portrayed young Willa Warren in the ABC drama series The Family and Jane Keane, the daughter of Amy Adams' character, in Tim Burton's biographical film Big Eyes (2014). Arthur has had guest roles in The Killing, The Tomorrow People, and Supernatural.

Early life
Arthur was born and raised in Vancouver, British Columbia, to Jane (née Walter) and Brian Arthur. She attended Sir Winston Churchill Secondary School, where she was voted as one of the co-valedictorians of her graduating class. Arthur was a competitive gymnast for 13 years before changing her focus to acting. She speaks fluent French.

Filmography

Film

Television

Web

References

External links

 

Living people
1997 births
21st-century Canadian actresses
Actresses from Vancouver
Canadian child actresses
Canadian film actresses
Canadian television actresses
Franco-Columbian people